Barrhill railway station is a railway station serving the village of Barrhill, South Ayrshire, Scotland.

History 
The station was opened by the Girvan and Portpatrick Junction Railway on 5 October 1877. The station was briefly closed between 7 February 1882 and 16 February 1882, and between 12 April 1886 and 14 June 1886.

The station features in the novel Five Red Herrings by Dorothy L Sayers, first published in 1931.

The line that runs through Barrhill station was temporarily closed between August and November 2018 due to the closures of platform 3 and 4 of  Ayr station. This was caused by the adjacent hotel building that was found to be structurally unsound, which was then subsequently secured and services then resumed.

Services

Pre-COVID
On Monday to Saturday, there is a regular two-hourly service to both Kilmarnock and Stranraer with a total of eight trains per day in each direction (with a four-hour gap in between trains in the Stranraer direction in the evening), two trains extend beyond Kilmarnock to Glasgow Central and four run the other way.

On Sundays, there are five trains per day each way Stranraer and Ayr.

December 2021
Mon-Sat: There are 4 trains per day to both Kilmarnock and Stranraer, running approximately every 4 hours. One train extends to Glasgow Central and two run the other way. Sunday service remains the same.

Signalling 
The small signal box that houses the lever frame operating the loop was installed in 1935 after its predecessor was destroyed by fire - it was originally situated further down the line at Portpatrick but dismantled and moved to Barrhill after becoming redundant at its original location. The box only houses the frame however - the tablet instruments and block bells are in the main station building, which allows one railman to act as both stationmaster and signaller.

References

Sources

External links

Video and narration on Barrhill Railway Station.

Railway stations in South Ayrshire
Railway stations in Great Britain opened in 1877
SPT railway stations
Railway stations served by ScotRail
Former Glasgow and South Western Railway stations
1877 establishments in Scotland